The Institute of Acoustics (IOA) is a British professional engineering institution founded in 1974.  It is licensed by the Engineering Council UK to assess candidates for inclusion on ECUK's Register of professional Engineers.  The institute's address is Silbury Court, 406 Silbury Boulevard, Milton Keynes MK9 2AF, United Kingdom.  The current president of the IOA is Alistair Somerville.  Past presidents include Barry Gibbs, John Hinton OBE, Colin English, David Weston, Tony Jones, Professor Trevor Cox, William Egan, Professor Bridget Shield, and Jo Webb.

History
In 1963 a Society of Acoustic Technology was formed in the UK for those interested in this subject: the President was Elfyn Richards.  Because of the interest in establishing a professional body, meetings were held with various societies and institutions, and in 1965 a British Acoustical Society was set up, absorbing the earlier society.
In 1974 the British Acoustical Society amalgamated with the Acoustics Group of the Institute of Physics to form the Institute of Acoustics.

Specialist groups 
 Building acoustics
 Electroacoustics
 Environmental noise
 Measurement and instrumentation
 Musical acoustics
 Noise and vibration engineering
 Physical acoustics
 Speech and hearing
 Underwater acoustics

Medals and awards 
The following prizes are awarded by the Institute
 Rayleigh Medal
 Tyndall Medal
 A B Wood Medal
 R W B Stephens Medal
 IOA Engineering Medal
 Honorary fellowship
 Peter Barnett Memorial Award
 The Award for Promoting Acoustics to the Public
 Award for Services to the Institute
 IOA Young Persons' Award for Innovation in Acoustical Engineering
 IOA Prize for best diploma student
 ANC prize for the best diploma project
 ANC prize for the best paper at an IOA conference

See also 
 Chartered engineer
 Incorporated engineer
 The Association of Noise Consultants

References

External links 
 Institute of Acoustics

1974 establishments in the United Kingdom
Acoustics
ECUK Licensed Members
Engineering societies based in the United Kingdom
Organisations based in Hertfordshire
Organisations based in Milton Keynes
Science and technology in Hertfordshire
Scientific organizations established in 1974